Barton Hall is field house on the campus of Cornell University, USA 

Barton Hall may also refer to most notable buildings:

Barton Hall (Alabama), plantation house near Cherokee, Alabama, USA
RAF Barton Hall, former RAF station and country house in the parish of Barton, Preston, England
Barton Hall, a country house in the parish of Barton Turf, Norfolk

Architectural disambiguation pages